Sundøy or Sundøya is a village in the municipality of Leirfjord in Nordland county, Norway. Sundøya has a population of about 120 people. It is located on the north side of the Vefsnfjorden on the northeastern part of the island of Alsta, east of the Seven Sisters mountains, which isolate it from the rest of the island. Since Sundøy is surrounded by mountains and water, it was only accessible by boat until 2003 when the Sundøy Bridge was built, providing a road connection to the mainland of Leirfjord.

References

Villages in Nordland
Leirfjord